M. A. Mannan (c. 1932 – 16 July 2016) was a Bangladeshi educator. He was a Bangladesh Awami League Advisory Council member and former lawmaker. He was awarded Ekushey Padak in 2015 by the Government of Bangladesh for his contribution to education.

Career
Mannan was an elected Awami League Member of the Parliament (MP) from Kishoreganj-2 (Katiadi-Pakundia) constituency in 2001 and 2008. He was the founding Head of Department of Neurology of Institute of Post Graduation and Medical Research (now named BSMMU). He was the founder-president of Neurology Foundation, Dhaka and Epilepsy Association of Bangladesh. He was also the founder of Bangladesh Tourism.

Mannan founded Dr Abdul Mannan Mohila College.

Early life
M. A. Mannan was born on 2 December 1932 in Katiadi Upazila of Kishoreganj District, His father's name was Amber Ali and his mother's name was Sakhina Begum. He obtained his FCPS degree in Internal Medicine from the Bangladesh College of Physicians and Surgeons in 1987.

References

1932 births
2016 deaths
Bangladeshi neurologists
Awami League politicians
Recipients of the Ekushey Padak
Burials at Banani Graveyard
Date of birth missing
Place of birth missing